Sufrim Lopes (born 25 March 1981 in Bissau) is a footballer from Guinea-Bissau who plays as a midfielder for S.C.U. Torreense in the Portuguese Second Division.

Sufrim previously played for Associação Naval 1º de Maio and S.C. Covilhã in the Liga de Honra and Onisilos Sotira in the Cypriot Second Division.

References

External links

Living people
1981 births
Bissau-Guinean footballers
Primeira Liga players
Bissau-Guinean expatriate sportspeople in Portugal
Expatriate footballers in Portugal
Bissau-Guinean expatriate sportspeople in Cyprus
Expatriate footballers in Cyprus
Associação Naval 1º de Maio players
S.C. Covilhã players
Onisilos Sotira players
Cypriot Second Division players
Sportspeople from Bissau
Association football midfielders